A terrorist attack on an event of Bangladesh Udichi Shilpigoshthi in Jessore, Bangladesh occurred on 6 March 1999. Two time bombs were used to kill 10 people and injure another 150.

Background
Bangladesh Udichi Shilpi goshthi is the largest cultural organisation in Bangladesh. In 2013, the organisation was awarded the Ekushey Padak, the Bangladesh's most prestigious award. Since 1999 many veteran jihadists from Afghanistan returned to Bangladesh and carried out attacks in Bangladesh.

Attack
The attacks happened after midnight at a cultural event of Udichi Shilpi goshthi in Jessore, Bangladesh. Five people were killed at the scene. Two time bombs exploded. The attacks took place on 6 March 1999. The event was taking place in Jessore Town hall grounds. Ten people were killed. The attacks were carried out by Harkat-ul-Jihad-al-Islami Bangladesh. Over 100 people were injured.

Trial

Mufti Abdul Hannan, the leader of Harkat-ul-Jihad al-Islami Bangladesh, admitted his role in the attack after his arrest and called the bombing a success.

References

1999 murders in Bangladesh
Improvised explosive device bombings in 1999
Improvised explosive device bombings in Bangladesh
Islamic terrorism in Bangladesh
Islamic terrorist incidents in 1999
Jashore District
March 1999 crimes
March 1999 events in Bangladesh
Mass murder in 1999
Terrorist incidents in Bangladesh in 1999
Building bombings in Bangladesh
20th-century mass murder in Bangladesh